The Model 41-47, Model 47, and Model 47-52 are circular Swedish anti-tank blast mines. The mines are broadly similar, differing only in size and weight.

Variants
 Model 41-47 
 Model 47
 Model 47-52B

Specifications
 Diameter: 270 mm
 Height: 125 mm
 Weight: 8 kg (Model 41–47), 9.5 kg (Model 47)
 Explosive content: 5 kg of TNT
 Operating pressure: 200 to 400 kg

References

 Jane's Mines and Mine Clearance 2005-2006
 
 

Anti-tank mines